Christmas Eve is a 1947 American comedy film directed by Edwin L. Marin. It is based on the story by Laurence Stallings and Richard H. Landau and stars George Raft, George Brent and Randolph Scott. An independent production by Benedict Bogeaus it was distributed by United Artists. It was rereleased under the title Sinner's Holiday.

It was one of several films Raft made with Edwin Marin.

Plot
The greedy nephew Philip Hastings of eccentric Matilda Reed seeks to have her judged incompetent so he can administer her wealth. In an informal meeting with Philip and Dr. Doremus, Judge Alston rules that she will be saved if her three long-lost adopted sons, whom she can trust, appear for a Christmas Eve reunion.

Separate stories reveal with the help of Private Detective Gimlet that: 
 Michael is a bankrupt playboy loved by loyal Ann Nelson; 
 Mario is a seemingly shady character tangling with a Nazi war criminal in South America and a beautiful lady, Claire; 
 Jonathan is a hard-drinking rodeo rider who falls for a flirtatious woman Jean Bradford at the station, who is revealed to be a policewoman in disguise chasing after an orphanage that doesn't seem to do right.

Finally, the gathering at Christmas Eve happens, featuring the three sons and Jean. Jonathan and Jean, end up bringing three girl orphans from the orphanage. Mario confronts Phillip about taking the rap for a bad deal in New Orleans ten years ago, for which he makes sure to have each leave town before Matilda gets hurt. Aunt Matilda feels like the day she got the three little boys for adoption.

Cast
 Ann Harding as Aunt Matilda Reed
 Reginald Denny as Phillip Hastings
 Clarence Kolb as Judge Alston
 Carl Harbord as Dr. Doremus 
 Joe Sawyer as Private Detective Gimlet
 George Raft as Mario Torio
 George Brent as Michael Brooks
 Randolph Scott as Jonathan "Johnny"
 Joan Blondell as Ann Nelson
 Virginia Field as Claire
 Dolores Moran as Jean Bradford
 Douglass Dumbrille as Dr. Bunyan
 Claire Whitney as Mrs. Bunyan
 John Litel as Joe Bland, FBI Agent
 Marie Blake as Reporter
 Dennis Hoey as Williams-Butler
 Molly Lamont as Harriet Rhodes
 John Litel as Joe Bland, FBI Agent
 Walter Sande as Mario's Hood
 Konstantin Shayne as Gustav Reichman
 Andrew Tombes as Auctioneer

Production
The film was produced by Benedict Bogeaus who had previously made an episodic film On Our Merry Way. This involved using multiple stars in different storylines so they could be filmed at different times. In November 1946 Bogeaus announced that Raft, Scott and Brent would star. Each star would film for two weeks individually and then act together for one week. Filming started 18 November with the Brent-Joan Blondell sequence.

Dolores Moran, who appeared in the cast, was Bogeaus' wife at the time. The film marked Ann Harding's first appearance since It Happened on Fifth Avenue.

The film was financed through money from Walter E. Heller & Co, a finance company.

During filming, George Raft suffered first-degree burns in his right leg when a maritime engine caught fire and set his clothes alight.

Reception

Critical
The Los Angeles Times said the premise of the film had "considerable appeal" but the "plot lacked cohesion" and the story was done in by its "slow pace".

Box office
The film did not do very well at the box office. According to Variety it earned an estimated $1 million.

Walter Heller and Co initiated foreclosure proceedings to recover money for the film, claiming they were owed $223,000. (They also did this for Bachelor's Daughters.) This was rare in Hollywood at the time.

1986 remake
The film was remade as a made-for-TV movie that first aired on NBC, December 22, 1986. It was directed by Stuart Cooper and starred Loretta Young, Trevor Howard, Arthur Hill, Ron Leibman, Patrick Cassidy, and Season Hubley.

See also
 List of Christmas films

References

External links
 
 
 
 
 Review of film at Variety

1947 films
American black-and-white films
American Christmas comedy films
1940s English-language films
United Artists films
Films directed by Edwin L. Marin
1940s Christmas comedy films
1947 comedy films
1940s American films